Sydney to the Max is an American comedy television series created by Mark Reisman that aired on Disney Channel from January 25, 2019 to November 26, 2021. The series stars Ruth Righi, Ava Kolker, Jackson Dollinger, Christian J. Simon, Ian Reed Kesler, and Caroline Rhea.

Series overview

Episodes

Season 1 (2019)

Season 2 (2019–20)

Season 3 (2021)

References 

Lists of American children's television series episodes
Lists of American comedy television series episodes
Lists of Disney Channel television series episodes